Naval Aviation Command can refer to:

 Argentine Naval Aviation
 Navy Aviation Command of Greece
 Republic of China Naval Aviation Command